For the last several years, the largest tournament in the world has been the World Series of Poker Main Event. With the exception of 1992, the US$10,000 buy-in tournament increased in prize pool year-over-year from its start in 1970 until 2007 (the latter a result of the Unlawful Internet Gambling Enforcement Act of 2006, which reduced the number of players winning their seats via online play).

The first tournament to reach a million dollar prize pool was the 1983 WSOP Main Event. The WSOP Main Event of 2004 had the first prize pool of above $10,000,000.

The largest non Hold'em Tournament has been the 2008 WSOP $50K HORSE with a prize pool of $7,104,000 and the first prize of $1,989,120 going to Scotty Nguyen.

Below are the 30 largest poker tournaments with respect to the prize pool in United States dollars and not number of entrants. This list includes live and online poker.

Currently, 14 of the 15 largest prize pools in history have been WSOP Main Events. The second largest prize pool outside of the Main Event is the 2012 WSOP event known as The Big One for One Drop, held from July 1–3. It featured a buy-in of US$1 million, the largest in poker history. Of the buy-in, $111,111 was a charitable donation to the One Drop Foundation, and the WSOP took no rake. All 48 seats available for that event were filled, resulting in a prize pool of $42,666,672, with over 5 million dollars donated. The second largest pool for any event outside of the WSOP was the 2012 Macau High Stakes Challenge, with a HK$2 million (US$260,000) buy-in plus a rebuy option. The event drew a field of 73, of which 21 made a rebuy, resulting in a prize pool of HK$182,360,000 (slightly over US$23.5 million).

All of the 30 richest tournaments to date were played in No Limit Hold'em.

Notes

Poker tournaments
Entertainment-related lists of superlatives